Senator Burgess may refer to:

H. S. Burgess (1866–1952), Illinois State Senate
Isabel Burgess (1912–1999), Arizona State Senate

See also
Judy Burges (born 1943), Arizona State Senate